The third series of Mam talent! premiered on Saturday 4 September 2010 at 20:00 on TVN. It consisted of seven auditions' episodes, five semi-finals and the final, which aired on 27 November 2010. The winner of the competition was Magda Welc, 11-year-old singer and she gained 300 000 PLN and the runner-up was Kamil Bednare. There was also a Special Prize - 100 000 PLN founded by Apart - which was given to Sabina Jeszka. Winner of the second series, Marcin Wyrostek performed during the first semi-final and Paul Potts, winner of the first series of Britain's Got Talent was a special guest on 13 November 2010.

Semi-final 1
Date: 23 October 2010
Special guest: Marcin Wyrostek

Semi-final 2
Date: 30 October 2010

Semi-final 3
Date: 6 November 2010

Semi-final 4
Date: 13 November 2010
Special guest: Paul Potts

Semi-final 5
Date: 20 November 2010

Final
Date: 27 November 2010

Live show chart

Ratings

References

3
2010 Polish television seasons